The  is a dam constructed as part of the Delta Works in the Netherlands. It separates water of the lakes Krammer and Volkerak from the Oosterschelde. The dam connects the Grevelingendam to Sint Philipsland.

History
A number of alternatives to the final location of the dam and the lock complex were investigated, with an important consideration being the preservation of valuable intertidal areas. The road connection on the south side of the dam required significant research as it runs through vulnerable nature reserves.

Eighteen months later, when the island was completed, construction of locks began for inland navigation and yachts. In 1983 the complex of locks Krammer was completed. The dam officially opened on February 2, 1987.

In 1994, a second lock was built for yachts.

Locks
The locks are technically sophisticated because they must avoid the exchange between the freshwater  Volkerak and the brackish water of the Oosterschelde. The locks are designed so that there is no influx of saltwater that enters the Volkerak and only a little fresh water in the Oosterschelde. The locks rely on the physical principle that saltwater is denser and sinks, while freshwater rises. By a complex system of pipes and pumps the saltwater is pumped from the bottom, or conversely, freshwater is pumped from the top, depending on the direction of the ship. Locks on inland waterways are 280 metres long and 24 metres wide.

Environmental impacts
The dam considerably changed the surrounding landscape. Alluvial tidal marsh now support a rich animal life. An observation hut was installed to facilitate the observation of the many species of birds such as the pied avocet.

See also 
 Delta Works
 Flood control in the Netherlands
 Rijkswaterstaat

References

External links
The Philipsdam at the Watersnoodmuseum Knowledge Centre Information on the Philipsdam from the official Watersnoodmuseum website

Delta Works
Dams completed in 1987
Dams in South Holland
Dams in Zeeland
Goeree-Overflakkee
Tholen